Tragedy of Youth (German: Jugendtragödie) is a 1929 German silent drama film directed by Adolf Trotz and starring Roland Varno, Eva Speyer and Jaro Fürth. The son of a washerwoman is sent to a reform school for a minor crime, but breaks out and commits a murder.

Cast
 Roland Varno as Peter
 Eva Speyer as Peters Muter
 Jaro Fürth as Inhaber einer Zeitungsfiliale
 Eberhard Mack as Sein Sohn Erich
 Wolfgang Zilzer as Emil
 Friedrich Kurth as Franz
 Emmy von Nagy as Cläre – ein Fürsorgezögling
 Fritz Kampers
 Julius Falkenstein
 Carla Bartheel
 Kurt Brenkendorf

References

Bibliography
 Prawer, S.S. Between Two Worlds: The Jewish Presence in German and Austrian Film, 1910–1933. Berghahn Books, 2005.

External links

1929 films
Films of the Weimar Republic
German silent feature films
German drama films
Films directed by Adolf Trotz
1929 drama films
German black-and-white films
Silent drama films
1920s German films
1920s German-language films